Awan (Punjabi and ) is a tribe living predominantly in the northern, central, and western parts of Pakistani Punjab, with significant numbers also present in Khyber Pakhtunkhwa, Azad Kashmir, and to a lesser extent in Sindh and Balochistan.

History
Jamal J. Elias notes that the Awans believe themselves to be of Arab origin, descended from Ali ibn Abu Talib and that the claim of Arab descent gives them "high status in the Indian Muslim environment".

Christophe Jaffrelot says: 

People of the Awan community have a strong presence in the Pakistani Army and a notable martial tradition. They were listed as an "agricultural tribe" by the British Raj in 1925, a term that was then synonymous with classification as a "martial race".

Notable people

 Nawab Malik Amir Mohammad Khan – Former Nawab of Kalabagh, Chief of the Awan tribe and Governor of West Pakistan from 1960 to 1966.
 Air Marshal Nur Khan – Commander-in-chief of the Pakistan Air Force, 1965–69, Governor of West Pakistan, 1969–70, and recipient of the Hilal-i-Jurat, the second-highest military award of Pakistan.
 Mir Sultan Khan – A chess master also believed by some to be the greatest natural chess player of modern times.
 Ahmad Nadeem Qasmi – Urdu poet, journalist, literary critic, dramatist, short story author, recipient of the Pride of Performance and Sitara-e-Imtiaz, the third-highest civil award of Pakistan.
 Sultan Bahu – A Sufi mystic, poet, scholar and founder of mystic tradition known as Sarwari Qadiri.
 Khadim Hussain Rizvi – A Pakistani Islamic scholar and the founder of Tehreek-e-Labbaik Pakistan.
 Ameer Muhammad Akram Awan – Islamic scholar and spiritual leader of the mystic tradition known as Naqshbandia Owaisiah.
Abdul Mannan Wazirabadi – Islamic scholar, jurist and muhaddith.
Dilip Kumar – An actor in Hindi cinema.
Babar Awan - Pakistani politician and lawyer
Hardev Bahri - linguist who wrote a two volume thesis on the Awankari dialect

See also
Tribes and clans of the Pothohar Plateau
Ahmed Gul Khel
Awan Patti

References

Further reading

Social groups of Pakistan